Black Sails may refer to:

 Black Sails, a subsidiary 745m summit of Wetherlam, a 763m summit in the Coniston Fells of the Lake District
 Black Sails (TV series), a 2014 American drama series
 Black Sails EP, a 1999 EP by AFI

See also
 Black Sails in the Sunset, a 1999 album by AFI
 Black Sails at Midnight, a 2009 album by Alestorm